Hofireh (also Romanized as Ḩofīreh and Ḩofeyreh; also known as Ḩoteyreh) is a village in Mosharrahat Rural District, in the Central District of Ahvaz County, Khuzestan Province, Iran. At the 2006 census, its population was 96, in 23 families.

References 

Populated places in Ahvaz County